General elections were held in Vanuatu on 6 March 1998. They "were held under the shadow of a state of emergency (the result of riots in Port Vila over governmental financial improprieties) and were accompanied by an unusually low turnout rate", with only 61.6% of registered voters casting a ballot.

The Vanua'aku Pati, led by Donald Kalpokas, obtained 18 seats. The ruling Union of Moderate Parties obtained 12, while the National United Party obtained 11, and the Melanesian Progressive Party 6.

The Vanua'aku Pati returned to power for the first time since 1991, forming a coalition with the NUP. Donald Kalpokas (VP) became Prime Minister, with Walter Lini (NUP) as deputy Prime Minister. The new government was exclusively anglophone, following the defeat of the francophone UMP.

Results

See also
List of members of the Parliament of Vanuatu (1998–2002)

References

Vanuatu
General
Elections in Vanuatu
Vanuatu